Skarbiec  is a village in the administrative district of Gmina Górowo Iławeckie within Bartoszyce County, Warmian-Masurian Voivodeship, in northern Poland. It is close to the border with the Kaliningrad Oblast of Russia.

References

Skarbiec